William Appleton Lawrence (May 21, 1889 - December 21, 1968) was the third bishop of the Episcopal Diocese of Western Massachusetts (1937–57). His father, William Lawrence, was the seventh Bishop of the Episcopal Diocese of Massachusetts (1893–1927).

Early life and family
Lawrence was born on May 21, 1889, in Cambridge, Massachusetts, the son of the Bishop of Massachusetts William Lawrence and Julia Cunningham. He was the grandson of the notable abolitionist Amos Adams Lawrence and a member of an influential "Boston Brahmin" family, founded by his great-great-grandfather and American revolutionary Samuel Lawrence. His great-grandfather was the noted philanthropist Amos Lawrence. Lawrence's brother, Frederic C. Lawrence, was suffragan bishop of the Episcopal Diocese of Massachusetts (1956–68).

Education and career
Lawrence graduated from Harvard College, as was the tradition in his family. He attended the Union Theological Seminary and the Episcopal Theological Seminary. He also studied at Lawrence College in Appleton, Wisconsin from where he graduated with a Doctor of Divinity in 1929.

Priest
Lawrence was ordained by his father, deacon on June 7, 1914, and priest in 1915. He was curate of Grace Church in Lawrence, Massachusetts until 1916 when he became rector of St Stephen's Church in Lynn, Massachusetts. In 1926 he went to Providence, Rhode Island to become rector of Grace Church.

Bishop
On October 21, 1936, Lawrence was elected as the third bishop to the Diocese of Western Massachusetts. He was consecrated on January 13, 1937, by his father Bishop William Lawrence and the Presiding Bishop James De Wolf Perry. In 1938, Lawrence created the first diocesan council and recommended that lay employees be included under social security.  Then, in 1946, he established Camp Bement, which was closed by the diocese in 2009. In his retirement, Lawrence developed what is known today as the Clergy Deployment Office. He was also active in civil rights, ecumenical and world peace causes. Lawrence retired in 1957. He died on December 21, 1968.

References

External links
 Episcopal Diocese of Western Massachusetts - official website

Appleton family
Harvard College alumni
Anglican pacifists
Harvard Divinity School alumni
1889 births
1968 deaths
20th-century American Episcopalians
Episcopal bishops of Western Massachusetts